Two Upbuilding Discourses (1843) is a book by Søren Kierkegaard.

History
Kierkegaard published Two Upbuilding Discourses three months after the publication of his big book, Either/Or, which ended without a conclusion to the argument between A, the aesthete and B, the ethicist, as to which is the best way to live one's life. Kierkegaard hoped the book would transform everything for both of them into inwardness.   In 1832 Hegel began an argument with Christianity by saying that knowledge is not something hurtful to faith but helpful. He says, philosophy (the love of knowledge) "has the same content as religion." This is due, in part, to the efforts of "Anselm and Abelard, who further developed the essential structure of faith" in the Middle Ages. Hegel wants people to base their belief in God on knowledge rather than faith, but, Kierkegaard wants each single individual to act out their faith before God. Faith isn't won by mental toil, it's won by personal struggle and the help of God. Kierkegaard steers his readers away from the outer world of observation to the inner world of faith.

Upbuilding was translated Edifying in 1946 when David F. Swenson first translated them. They became Upbuilding Discourses in Howard V. Hong's translation of 1990. Kierkegaard compared the poet, A in Either/Or, to the upbuilding speaker in a book published in 1846, "the decisive difference between the poet and the upbuilding speaker remains, namely, that the poet has no end or goal other than psychological truth and the art of presentation, whereas the speaker in addition has principally the aim of transposing everything into the upbuilding. The poet becomes absorbed in the portrayal of the passion, but for the upbuilding speaker this is only the beginning, and the next is crucial for him-to compel the stubborn person to disarm, to mitigate, to elucidate, in short, to cross over into the upbuilding." And what did edifying or upbuilding mean to Kierkegaard? He explained this in relation to love in 1847, "To build up is to presuppose love; to be loving is to presuppose love; only love builds up. To build up is to erect something from the ground up – but, spiritually, love is the ground of everything. No human being can place the ground of love in another person’s heart; yet love is the ground, and we build up only from the ground up; therefore we can build up only by presupposing love. Take love away – then there is no one who builds up and no one who is built up."

Either/Or ends with Kierkegaard’s first upbuilding discourse, The Upbuilding Thought That Lies in the Thought That in Relation to God We Are Always in the Wrong.  He says, "Why did you wish to be in the wrong in relation to a person? Because you loved. Why did you find it upbuilding? Because you loved. The more you loved, the less time you had to deliberate upon whether or not you were in the right; your love had only one desire, that you might continually be in the wrong. So also in your relationship with God. You loved God, and therefore your soul could find rest and joy only in this, that you might always be in the wrong. You did not arrive at this acknowledgment out of mental toil; you were not forced, for when you are in love you are in freedom." Kierkegaard uses the Two Upbuilding Discourses to explain that the single individual has a relationship with God that is based on faith, not on knowledge. When faith announces itself within the individual, the job is to protect faith against its greatest enemy, doubt.

Structure 
Each of the Eighteen Upbuilding Discourses begin with a dedication: To the late Michael Pedersen Kierkegaard, formerly a clothing merchant here in the city my Father these discourses are dedicated. 
Next, there is either a Preface or a prayer attached to one of the discourses. The Preface is dedicated to that single individual Kierkegaard calls my reader.
Finally the discourses themselves are presented. Each discourse is based on a Bible passage. These are the titles of his first two discourses.
The Expectancy of Faith
Every Good and Every Perfect Gift is From Above

Dedication, Preface, or Prayer 
The dedication is worded exactly the same in each of his eighteen upbuilding discourses. He didn't dedicate one of his discourses to his mother but only to his father. One scholar wondered about this: "With regard to family affairs, it is remarkable that Søren never mentions his mother. She is never even named in his journals; and while he never tired of speaking about his father and dedicated all his Edifying Discourses to him, we have not a single word from his pen about his mother. Not once is her death mentioned with even a word, although from other sources it would appear that he took this to heart, and sorrowed greatly." It's not known why Kierkegaard never mentioned his mother in any of his works.

The Preface to each work is directed toward that single individual that Kierkegaard refers to as my reader. Although this little book (which is called "discourses", not sermons, because its author does not have authority to preach, “upbuilding discourses,” not discourses for upbuilding, because the speaker by no means claims to be a teacher) wishes to be only what it is, a superfluity, and desires only to remain in hiding, just as it came into existence in concealment, I nevertheless have not bidden it farewell without an almost fantastic hope. Inasmuch as in being published it is in a figurative sense starting a journey, I let my eyes follow it for a little while. I saw how it wended its way down solitary paths or walked solitary on public roads. After a few little mistakes, through being deceived by a fleeting resemblance, it finally met that single individual whom I with joy and gratitude call my reader, that single individual it is seeking, to whom, so to speak, it stretches out its arms, that single individual who is favorably enough disposed to allow himself to be found,  favorably enough disposed to receive it, whether at the time of the encounter it finds him cheerful and confident or “weary and pensive,” –On the other hand, inasmuch as in being published it actually remains quiet without moving from the spot, I let my eyes rest on it for a little while. It stood there like a humble little flower under the cover of the great forest, sought neither for its splendor nor its fragrance nor its food value. But I also saw, or thought I saw, how the bird I call my reader suddenly noticed it, flew down to it, picked it, and took it home, and when I had seen this, I saw no more. Copenhagen, May 5, 1843 Preface His expectancy was humble. His hope was that one single individual might take an interest in his little pamphlet. Five years later he wrote,  “The big work, Either/Or was ‘much read and more discussed’-and then the Two Edifying Discourses, dedicated to my deceased father, published on my birthday (May 5), “a little flower hidden in the great forest, not sought out either for its beauty, or for its scent, or because it was nourishing’. No one took serious notice of the two discourses or concerned himself about them." One of his friends bought the book and complained because it wasn't clever. Kierkegaard offered him his money back.

Either/or was indirect communication but Kierkegaard’s discourses are direct communication. The two modes of communication have ultimately the same aim: “to make aware of the religious, the essentially Christian.” 

Later, in May 1849, Kierkegaard wrote this: 

Kierkegaard begins each of his Eighteen Discourses of 1843-1844 with a prayer. The following is part of his first prayer. The new year faces us with its requirements, and even though we enter it downcast and troubled because we cannot and do not wish to hide from ourselves the thought of the lust of the eye that infatuated, the sweetness of revenge that seduced, the anger that made us unrelenting, the cold heart that fled far from you, we nevertheless do not go into the new year entirely empty-handed, since, we shall indeed also take along with us recollections of the fearful doubts that were set at rest, of the lurking concerns that were soothed, of the downcast disposition that was raised up, of the cheerful hope that was not humiliated.

The Expectancy of Faith 
Galatians 3:23 to the end:
“Before this faith came, we were held prisoners by the law, locked up until faith should be revealed. So the law was put in charge to lead us to Christ that we might be justified by faith. Now that faith has come, we are no longer under the supervision of the law. You are all sons of God through faith in Christ Jesus, for all of you who were baptized into Christ have clothed yourselves with Christ. There is neither Jew nor Greek, slave nor free, male nor female, for you are all one in Christ Jesus. If you belong to Christ, then you are Abraham's seed, and heirs according to the promise.” (NIV translation)

Every individual is engaged in a struggle with himself whether he knows it or not. He has a “natural need to formulate a life-view, a conception of the meaning of life and its purpose.” Many will find meaning and purpose in maintaining health, developing talent, or having money.  All the worldly goods are outer goods and each person struggles to possess his share of these goods. Kierkegaard says, “Faith is not only the highest good, but it is a good in which all are able to share, and the person who rejoices in the possession of it also rejoices in the countless human race, “because what I possess,” he says, “every human being has or could possess.” No one ever has to struggle with another to gain faith. One must struggle only with oneself and with God.

He goes on to say that it's a duty to have faith and not to have faith is a sin. Kierkegaard says an individual "puts on duty," because duty is not "outside himself but within himself". His definition of sin is that it's the opposite of faith. He is interested in helping the person find faith but he has too much respect for the individual to just wish faith into his being. He says, "if I could do that, then the very moment I gave it to him I would be taking it from him, since by giving him the highest, I would be depriving him of the highest, because the highest was that he could give it to himself." (...) "Therefore, I will thank God that this is not the way it is. My love has only lost its worries and won joy, because I know that by my making every effort I still would be unable to preserve the good for him as securely as he himself will preserve it, and he must not thank me for it either, not because I am releasing him but because he owes me nothing at all." Early existentialist writers developed their thinking along this same line of thought.  Delmore Schwartz said, "No one can take your bath for you." Martin Heidegger said, "No one can die your death for you." Rudolf Bultmann, along with Kierkegaard, said, "No one can hold your faith for you."
 Kierkegaard examined how different reactions to life's conditions are affected by whether an individual has faith or not. "When the world commences its drastic ordeal, when the storms of life crush youth’s exuberant expectancy, when existence, which seemed so affectionate and gentle, changes into a pitiless proprietor who demands everything back, everything that it gave in such a way that it can take it back-then the believer most likely looks at himself and his life with sadness and pain, but he still says, “There is an expectancy that the whole world cannot take from me; it is the expectancy of faith, and this is victory. I am not deceived, since I did not believe that the world would keep the promise it seemed to be making to me, my expectancy was not in the world but in God." (...) The other view is presented with this quote. "When everything changes, when grief supersedes joy, then they fall away, they lose faith, or, more correctly-let us not confuse the language-they then show that they never had it." Eighteen Upbuilding Discourses The Expectancy of Faith P.23-25

Every Good and Every Perfect Gift is From Above 
James 1:17-22  The text for this Discourse:
“Every good and perfect gift is from above, coming down from the Father of the heavenly lights, who does not change like shifting shadows. He chose to give us birth through the word of truth, that we might be a kind of firstfruits of all he created. My dear brothers, take note of this: Everyone should be quick to listen, slow to speak and slow to become angry, for man's anger does not bring about the righteous life that God desires. Therefore, get rid of all moral filth and the evil that is so prevalent and humbly accept the word planted in you, which can save you. Do not merely listen to the word, and so deceive yourselves. Do what it says.” (NIV translation)

This discourse deals with the new way a Christian sees once he's discovered that he has faith. Again, one is not to explain what faith is, that would be a waste of time. In Fear and Trembling Kierkegaard says, "Even if someone were able to transpose the whole content of faith into conceptual form, it does not follow that he has comprehended faith, comprehended how he entered into it or how it entered into him." Faith isn't an outer good; it is for the inner man. Kierkegaard says the following in Concluding Unscientific Postscript, In the godly discourse about faith, the main point is that it informs us how you and I (that is, single individuals) become believers and that the speaker helps tear us out of all illusions and knows about the long and laborious way and about relapse.  … we sit (in Church) and observe what faith is capable of doing-not as believers, but as spectators of the achievements of faith, just as in our day we do not have speculative thinkers but spectators of the achievements of speculative thought. But for the theocentric, speculative, and objective age it is, of course, more likely far too little- to become involved in the ultimate difficulties, where the question ultimately becomes as sharp, as penetrating, as disturbing, as uncompromising as possible about whether the individual, you and I, is a believer and about how we relate ourselves to faith from day to day. Postscript Note p. 419

It is very difficult for an individual to know that "God is good." We can try to change God and make our wishes his wishes but then Kierkegaard explains, "I would have been weak enough to make him just as weak; then I would have lost him and my trust in him, . . ." Kierkegaard asks questions to try to understand how faith can be understood by an individual. He says, "Is there joy in heaven, only sorrow on earth, or only the news that there is joy in heaven! Does God in heaven bring out the good gifts and lay them away for us in heaven so that we can receive them sometime in the hereafter!" His understanding is that God makes good and perfect gifts for "anyone who has enough heart to be humble."

Too often individuals "pervert God's good gifts to their own detriment" or the second one wish is fulfilled they ask for another, without even remembering to say thanks to God for the first wish. The sermon text is there but Kierkegaard admits that sometimes he's "too cowardly, or too proud, or too lazy to want to understand the words properly." He also points out that people who are unable to live up to God's commands "prefer to be ashamed of themselves in their solitude." He says, "Have you been prompt in enduring the pain of the accounting; have you borne in mind that he loved you first? Have you been quick to judge for yourself that he should not continue to love you while you were slow to love in return?" His point is: "A person can truly love God only when he loves him according to his own imperfection".

“If a person were permitted to distinguish among Biblical texts, I could call this text [James 1:17-21] my first love, to which one generally (‘always’) returns at some time: and I could call this text my only love — to which one returns again and again and again and ‘always.’ ”Journals Book XI 3B 291:4 August 1855

Reception 
Kierkegaard sold 200 copies of the Discourses and only one editor reviewed it. Either/Or was reviewed by both Meïr Aron Goldschmidt and Johan Ludvig Heiberg. The Two Discourses had to wait until 1927 to be noticed and wasn't translated into English until 1946 when David F. Swenson translated the eighteen discourses and published them in four volumes. And then Howard V. Hong translated and published them in 1990 into one volume. Scholars relate most of Kierkegaard's work to his relationship to his father, Regine Olsen, the Corsair affair, or his attack upon the church; all deal with his outer being.

Criticism 
Kierkegaard was a Lutheran and his stance was the same as that of Martin Luther's five solas.  Hegel thought differently about faith, he says, “The One Spirit is in fact the substantial foundation; this is the spirit of a people, as it takes a definite shape in the individual periods of the history of the world. it is the national spirit. This constitutes the substantial foundation in the individual; each person is born in his own nation and belongs to the spirit of that people. This spirit is in fact the substantial element, and as it were the identical element of nature; it is the absolute foundation of faith. It is the standard which determines what is to be regarded as truth. (…) Each individual as belonging to the spirit of his people is born in the faith of his fathers, without his fault and without his desert, and the faith his fathers is a sacred thing to the individual and is his authority. This constitutes that basis of faith afforded by historical development. “  Georg Wilhelm Friedrich Hegel, Translated by Ebenezer Brown Speirs,  Lectures on the philosophy of religion, together with a work on the proofs of the existence of God. Translated from the 2d German ed. by E.B. Speirs, and J. Burdon Sanderson: the translation edited by E.B. Speirs (1895) p. 222-223 The difference between Kierkegaard and Hegel was that Kierkegaard believed the single individual comes to faith while Hegel believes the whole nation comes to faith in a cosmic consciousness.

Kierkegaard used Immanuel Kant as an example of a scientific individual and wondered how he would respond to Hegel were he alive. Kierkegaard wrote, "If a man like Kant, standing on the pinnacle of scientific scholarship, were to say in reference to demonstrations of the existence of God: Well, I do not know anything more about that than that my father told me it was so-this is humorous and actually says more than a whole book about demonstrations, if the book forgets this."

Hegel believes faith is derived through necessity and Kierkegaard believes a person comes to faith in freedom. In Hegel's universe a person is a Christian because his father was a Christian, just like someone might be a plumber because his father was a plumber. Kierkegaard didn't believe that philosophy or history can lead anyone to faith. He even said, "Philosophy cannot and must not give faith." He said the same thing in Either/Or.Philosophy has nothing to do with what could be called the inner deed, but the inner deed is the true life of freedom. Philosophy considers the external deed, yet in turn it does not see this as isolated but sees it as assimilated into and transformed in the world-historical process. This process is the proper subject for philosophy and it considers this under the category of necessity. Therefore it rejects the reflection that wants to point out that everything could be otherwise; it views world-history in such a way that there is no question of an Either/Or. Søren Kierkegaard, Either/Or Vol. II Hong p. 174

Kurt F. Reinhardt said the following in his 1952 book, The Existentialist Revolt (23): The Socratic method consists, according to Kierkegaard, in leading the reader to a point where he finds out for himself what the author has been trying to convey to him, without the need of "direct communication." To accomplish this, Kierkegaard needed a number of sharply profiled individual characters whose thoughts and actions he could experimentally develop to their extreme possibilities. This is the explanation of the use of the many pseudonyms in Kierkegaard's works. "With my left hand," he says, "I gave to the world 'Either /Or (i.e., pseudonymous "indirect communication"), and with my right hand 'Two Edifying Discourses'" (i.e., "direct communication" over the signature of his own name). 

John George Robertson discussed Kierkegaard's Two Upbuiding Discourses in 1914. "This is not the place to deal in detail with Kierkegaard's purely theological activity, although its significance, especially for Denmark, was quite as great as his writings on aesthetic and ethic questions. Has not Dr Brandes claimed for him that he is the greatest religious thinker of the entire nineteenth century? The militant character of Kierkegaard's individualism first assumed its full proportions in his interpretation of religious doctrines. Some three months after Enten Eller appeared To opbyggelige Taler (Two Edifying Addresses), in which he faced the difficult problem of reconciling the essentially social Christian faith with his own uncompromising individualism. The idea of altruistic Christian love put peculiar difficulties in his way, which he ultimately solved by defining that love, not as an immediate relation of one human being to another, but as an indirect relation through God."

Walter Lowrie said the Two Discourses were an "either/or" meant for Regine Olsen. His general approach to the discourses was how they related to the outer aspects of Kierkegaard's life; especially his relationship with Regine Olsen. He also mentions that his Unbuilding Discourses were "tardily translated" by the Germans "for the sake of completing the edition." "Therefore, since these works were not available to students the pseudonyms works were not rightly understood." A later scholar agreed with Lowrie about Regine and went so far as to say, "Shortly before leaving Berlin he had finished part two of Either/Or and had set to work on the aesthetic part. The book was finished late in autumn, and came out on February 20, 1843. Of the reception it got I have spoken earlier. Some months later under his own name Two Edifying Discourses, which no one took any notice of. All through his life Kierkegaard has over and over again, and in all possible ways, asserted that his authorship can all be traced back to what he went through in his relationship with Regine."

Kierkegaard tried to explain himself, “Although Either/Or attracted all the attention, and nobody noticed the Two Edifying Discourses, this book betokened, nevertheless, that the edifying was precisely what must come to the fore, that the author was a religious author, who for this reason has never written anything aesthetic, but has employed pseudonyms for all the aesthetic works, whereas the Two Edifying Discourses were by Magister Kierkegaard.” "I held out Either/Or to the world in my left hand, and in my right the Two Edifying Discourses; but all, or as good as all, grasped with their right what I held in my left. I had made up my mind before God what I should do: I staked my case on the Two Edifying Discourses; but I understood perfectly that only very few understood them. And here for the first time comes in the category ‘that individual whom with joy and gratitude I call my reader’, a stereotyped formula which was repeated in the Preface to every collection of Edifying Discourses."

He also explained what he meant by the individual human being. "'The individual’ is the category of spirit, of spiritual awakening, a thing as opposite to politics as well could be thought of. Earthly reward, power, honour, etc., have no connexion with the right use of this category. For even if it is used in the interest of the established order, inwardness does not interest the world; and when it is used catastrophically, it still does not interest the world, for to make sacrifices, or to be sacrificed (which may in fact be the consequence of declining to entertain the thought of becoming a power of a material sort), does not interest the world. ‘The individual’-that is the decisive Christian category, and it will be decisive also for the future of Christianity."

References

Sources

Primary sources 
 Two Upbuilding Discourses, 1843 Swenson translation
 Eighteen Upbuilding Discourses, by Søren Kierkegaard, Princeton University Press. Hong, 1990
 Either/Or Part I, Edited by Victor Eremita, February 20, 1843, translated by David F. Swenson and Lillian Marvin Swenson Princeton University Press 1971
 Either/Or Part 2, Edited by Victor Eremita, February 20, 1843, Hong 1987
 Fear and Trembling; Copyright 1843 Søren Kierkegaard – Kierkegaard’s Writings; 6 – copyright 1983 – Howard V. Hong
 Concluding Unscientific Postscript to Philosophical Fragments Volume I, by Johannes Climacus, edited by Søren Kierkegaard, Copyright 1846 – Edited and Translated by Howard V. Hong and Edna H. Hong 1992 Princeton University Press
 The Point of View for My Work as An Author: A Report to History, edited by Benjamin Neilson, by Søren Kierkegaard 1848,  Translated with Introductory Notes by Walter Lowrie, 1962, Harper and Row Publishers
The Sickness Unto Death, by Anti-Climacus, Edited by Søren Kierkegaard, Copyright 1849 Translation with an Introduction and notes by Alastair Hannay 1989

Secondary sources 
Lectures on the philosophy of religion, together with a work on the proofs of the existence of God, Vol 1, Translated from the 2d German ed. by E.B. Speirs, and J. Burdon Sanderson: the translation edited by E.B. Speirs (1895)  Hegel, Georg Wilhelm Friedrich, 1832
Søren Kierkegaard, A Biography, by Johannes Hohlenberg, Translated by T.H. Croxall, Pantheon Books 1954
 Hunt,George Laird, 
 A Short Life of Kierkegaard, by Walter Lowrie, Princeton University Press, 1942, 1970

Online sources 
 A Selection from Two Upbuilding Discourses 1843 Free Audio 
Notre Dame Philosophical Reviews

External links
 
 D. Anthony Storm's Commentary on Kierkegaard
 Richard Bauckham In the Mirror of God's Word: Kierkegaard and the Epistle of James Vimeo Video

Books by Søren Kierkegaard
1843 books